Centennial High School is a public secondary school located in unincorporated Clark County, Nevada, United States, in Las Vegas. The school serves about 3000 students in grades 9 to 12 in the Clark County School District.

In 2000, the movie Pay It Forward was filmed at Centennial High.

The Centennial boys volleyball team from 2003 under head coach David Fish went undefeated (23-0) and had three of its players go on to play at the division 1 collegiate level at Brigham Young University.

Centennial High School has had thirteen state championship teams in the 2008-2009 school year: men's cross-country, women's basketball, women's soccer, and women's softball. And has the Overall Best NJROTC in the nation.

Centennial High School is also well known for having one of the best Track and Field programs in the state. Head Coach, Roy Sessions, has led the women's team to 13 State wins.

The school gained notoriety when it was learned that the 311 Boyz attended school there. The youths were heavily influenced by the Bumfights series. In 2004, Bumfights copyright holder Ty Besson praised the school for "educating teens the right way to learn".

Extracurricular activities

NJROTC
In 2007, the Centennial High School Naval Junior Reserve Officers' Training Corps (NJROTC) unit was rated the most outstanding in the nation by The Navy League.They have been known for being one of the best and youngest Units in America.

In 2001 and 2008, the Centennial High School NJROTC unit won 3rd overall in the nation at the Navy Nationals Championship in Pensacola, Florida. The 2014-2015 school year the Centennial High School NJROTC won 3rd overall and 1st in the nation for their Color Guard. The 2015-2016 school year at Navy Nationals, Centennial took home 4th in the nation and 3rd in the nation for Color Guard. Also in the 2015-2016 school year, Centennial High School NJROTC was awarded Overall Best Unit from the Area 13 Commander, Captain Daniel Wenceslao (USN Ret.). Centennial's NJROTC is run by the Senior Naval Science Instructor, Commander Richard Pokropski, and three Naval Science Instructors: Senior Chief Petty Officer Thomas Borders, Master Chief Petty Officer Jim Lyle, and Senior Chief Petty Officer Sayre. All three instructors are United States Navy, retired, while the Commander is United States Coast Guard, retired. Captain Hardeman retired at the end of the 2010-2011 school year and Petty Officer First Class Johnson retired at the end of the 2018-2019 school year.

Centennial High School NJROTC unit has won the Navy Nationals competition twice in its history, unusually winning by both the largest margin (200 points, 2009) and subsequently the smallest margin (3 points, 2010). Just as important, they are the ONLY school to be selected as the Capt. Jim Harvey award winner in two different years. This award is presented to the school that best displays fair play, hard work, sportsmanship and pride in all they do.

Singers
In 2007 under the direction of Alan Zabriskie the Centennial High School Chamber Singers were honored to sing at the 2007 ACDA National Convention in Miami, Florida.
The new choral teacher is Karen Miskell.

Prior to Zabriskie, Nicki Bakko Toliver was the Choral Director who developed the high quality choral program earning Superior and Gold ratings from regional and national competitions. Her students performed in District, State and National Honor Choirs.  She has recently completed her DMA in choral conducting at North Dakota State University and is now the Assistant Professor of Choral Music at Wartburg College in Waverly, Iowa.

Nevada Interscholastic Activities Association State Championships
Volleyball (Boys) - 2003, 2018, 2019
Basketball (Girls) – 2002, 2003, 2004, 2005, 2009, 2011, 2015, 2016, 2017, 2018, 2019, 2020, (COVID/uncontested 2021), 2022, 2023
Cross Country (Boys) – 2008, 2010, 2012, 2013, 2018, 2019
Cross Country (Girls) – 2000, 2017
Cheer leading - 2010
Soccer (Girls) – 2003, 2005, 2008, 2009
Softball - 2004, 2009, 2012
Track and Field (Girls) – 2002, 2011, 2012, 2013, 2014, 2015, 2016, 2017, 2018, 2019, (COVID/uncontested 2020, 2021), 2022
Track and Field (Boys) - 2012, 2013, 2015
Bowling (Boys)- 2011, 2013, 2014
Bowling (Girls) - 2016
Science Olympiad- 2012, 2014
Baseball (Boys) Bryce Massanari

Notable alumni

Troy Brown Jr. (born 1999), NBA player for the Los Angeles Lakers
Aaron Fotheringham (born 1991), extreme wheelchair athlete and the first person to land a backflip in a wheelchair
Italee Lucas (born 1989), selected 21st overall by the Tulsa Shock in the 2011 WNBA draft.
Alex Marshall (born 1989), piano/guitarist for the band The Cab
Tommy Pham (born 1988), major league baseball outfielder
Tasha Schwikert (born 1984), member of the 2000 U.S. Olympic team in gymnastics NCAA champion, and six-time national champion.
Rhamondre Stevenson (born 1998), NFL player

Feeder schools
Eileen Conners Elementary School
Edith Garehime Elementary School
Shiela R. Tarr Academy of International Studies Elementary School
Marc Kahre Elementary School
Dorothy Eisenberg Elementary School
Ruthe Duskin Elementary School
Dean Lamar Allen Elementary School
Marshall C. Darnell Elementary School
Henry & Evelyn Bozarth Elementary School
Justice Myron E. Leavitt Middle School
Edmundo “Eddie” Escobedo Senior Middle School
Irwin & Susan Molasky Junior High School

References

Clark County School District
Educational institutions established in 1999
High schools in Clark County, Nevada
School buildings completed in 1999
1999 establishments in Nevada
Public high schools in Nevada